Flag of Punjab may refer to:

Flag of Punjab, India, a symbol of Punjab, State of India (Charda Punjab)
Flag of Punjab, Pakistan, a symbol of Punjab, Province of Pakistan (Lehnda Punjab)